Turret Peak is a high peak of the Needle Mountains, a subrange of the San Juan Mountains in the southwestern part of the US State of Colorado. It is located in the Weminuche Wilderness, part of the San Juan National Forest.
 
Turret Peak is the 89th highest independent peak in Colorado.

See also

List of Colorado mountain ranges
List of Colorado mountain summits
List of Colorado fourteeners
List of Colorado 4000 meter prominent summits
List of the most prominent summits of Colorado
List of Colorado county high points

References

External links

Turret Peak on Summitpost

San Juan Mountains (Colorado)
Mountains of La Plata County, Colorado
North American 4000 m summits
San Juan National Forest
Mountains of Colorado